Lesbian, gay, bisexual, and transgender (LGBT) persons in  Tokelau face legal challenges not experienced by non-LGBT residents. Both male and female same-sex sexual activity are legal in Tokelau, but same-sex couples and households headed by same-sex couples are not eligible for the same legal protections available to opposite-sex married couples.

History
Tokelau, similarly to Samoa, the Cook Islands, New Zealand, Niue and other Polynesian states, possesses a traditional and cultural third gender population. People living as this gender role have traditionally been accepted by Tokelauan society.

Law regarding same-sex sexual activity
Same-sex sexual activity has been legal in Tokelau since 2003 by the Crimes, Procedure and Evidence Rules 2003. Before that, male homosexual activity was illegal under sections 170 and 171 of Niue Act 1966 as extended to Tokelau by the Tokelau Islands Crimes Regulations 1975.

Recognition of same-sex relationships
Same-sex unions are not recognized (even though they are in New Zealand). Tokelau law does not explicitly prohibit same-sex marriage, but generally assumes the parties to be male and female. The Constitution of Tokelau states the following:
 in English: The family is the basis of the nation, and the positive approach we use for the raising of our families shall be the basis for making national decisions.
 in Tokelauan:

Living conditions
Much like the rest of Polynesia, open displays of affection between partners regardless of sexual orientation may offend.

Summary table

See also

Human rights in Tokelau
LGBT rights in New Zealand 
LGBT rights in Oceania

References

Tokelau
Politics of Tokelau
Tokelauan law
Tokelau
Rights
Human rights in Tokelau